The women's 400 metre individual medley swimming competition at the 2002 Asian Games in Busan was held on 5 October at the Sajik Swimming Pool.

Schedule
All times are Korea Standard Time (UTC+09:00)

Records

Results 
Legend
DNS — Did not start

Heats

Final

References 

2002 Asian Games Report, Pages 225–226
Results

Swimming at the 2002 Asian Games